Andrei Sangheli (born 20 July 1944) is a Moldovan politician.

Sangheli was the second Prime Minister of Moldova from 1992 until 1997. He represented the Moldovenist group of the Agrarian Party of Moldova.

References

1944 births
Prime Ministers of Moldova
Living people
People from Rîșcani District
Agrarian Party of Moldova politicians